Nocciolini di Canzo are sweet crumbly small cookies from Canzo, in northern Italy. They are recognized as a PAT of Lombardy by the Italian Ministry of Agricultural, Food and Forestry Policies.

Context and preparation
Canzo is a town in the mountainous Lombardy region, which draws tourists with its mountains, lake, fairs, history, and also for festivities related to Saint Mir, a native of this town. All the surroundings of Canzo have a mainly deciduous vegetation, and hazel is the most common species of tree.

In order to satisfy tourists’ demands, the confectioners of Canzo created Nocciolini di Canzo, made from hazelnut flour (local hazelnuts and sugar) and egg white. The appearance of this sweet is a small half-sphere. They are usually eaten as a snack but, due to their small size, they can also be used as cake decoration.

See also
 Canzo
 Vespetrò
 Canzo – Cuisine
 List of cookies
 Lombard cuisine
 List of Italian desserts and pastries

References

Italian desserts
Italian pastries
Cuisine of Lombardy
Cookies